Maharashtri Konkani or Konkan Marathi, is a group of Konkanic dialects spoken in the Konkan division of the Konkan region. George Abraham Grierson, a British Indian linguist of the colonial era referred to these dialects as the Konkan Standard of Marathi in order to differentiate it inside the Konkani language group.

Because speakers of Goan Konkani and Canara Konkani, which are distinct and different sets of Konkani dialects, refer to their language as simply "Konkani", Maharashtri Konkani is often mistakenly extended to cover these dialect groups .

See also
 Malvani language

References

Languages of India
Konkani
Marathi language